Leslie Austin (21 November 1885 – May 1974) was an English actor. He appeared in 30 films between 1915 and 1930.

He was born in London, England.

Filmography

External links

Leslie Austin at IBDB.com

1885 births
1974 deaths
English male film actors
English male silent film actors
20th-century English male actors